Palaemon xiphias is a species of shrimp of the family Palaemonidae. It is found in the eastern Central Atlantic and the Mediterranean.

References

Palaemonidae
Crustaceans of the Atlantic Ocean
Fauna of the Mediterranean Sea
Crustaceans described in 1816
Taxa named by Antoine Risso